Jeffrey R. Wittek (born December 15, 1989) is an American YouTuber, comedian, and podcaster. He runs the series Jeff's Barbershop and the podcast, Jeff FM.

Early life 
Wittek was born in Staten Island, New York, where he attended Susan E. Wagner High School. He grew up in a rough neighborhood and as a teenager made money by working at local barbershops and also by selling drugs. He continued selling drugs after relocating to Miami, Florida, and was eventually arrested in 2011 for possession of marijuana, cocaine, and a controlled substance, as well as illegal drug trafficking. The charges were dismissed for lack of a search warrant, after which he moved to Los Angeles, planning to buy marijuana in bulk and mail it back to New York City.

Career

2010: Bad Girls Club Season 5 
Jeff made an appearance on Bad Girls Club in multiple episodes of Season 5. He was introduced as one of the contestant's crush, Erica. During Season 5, Episode 3, the cast members went to the bar where they met up with Wittek. Catya and Kristen grew frustrated with him after he did not pay for their $32 tab, Wittek stating "Forget it". Erica was told by Catya not to sleep with him, but Erica was mad that Catya told her what to do. Erica continued flirting with him, the show even showing Jeff whispering in her ear while sitting on a pool table. Catya continued to express her frustration at him not picking up the tab even though he allegedly said he would in the limo ride back to their mansion. Jeff is then seen at the mansion talking to Erica, stating his confusion on why Catya would think he would pick up the tab. Things got heated when Catya approached him at the mansion, stating he should leave, spitting on his face with Wittek responding by spitting back at her face.

2012–16: Early YouTube and 1600 Vine 
Wittek started his YouTube account in 2011, but first became known for the Tumblr account he started in 2012, "Behind the Cuts", where he styled the hair of celebrities like Mac Miller and Pauly D. He also posted hair styling and party pictures on Instagram.

Wittek's fame increased after his 2014 move to 1600 Vine, a Hollywood apartment building known for housing internet celebrities like Jake Paul and Lele Pons. There he met the Vlog Squad.
For three years starting in 2015, he dated actress Cierra Ramirez.

2017–19: The Vlog Squad and Jeff’s Barbershop 
He started filming episodes for his online talk show Jeff's Barbershop in 2019, and gained enough popularity to become a brand ambassador for Old Spice.

2020–present: Accident, Don’t Try This at Home, Patreon, and Lawsuit 
In June 2020, Wittek was injured in Utah while filming a stunt with David Dobrik and the Vlog Squad. Dobrik was illegally operating an excavator in a shallow lake while Wittek swung from a rope attached to the end of the excavator arm. When Dobrik started spinning the rope too fast, Wittek hit the excavator and fell into the water upside down with his foot stuck in the rope. His skull was fractured in nine places, his left eye socket was fractured, his hip and foot were broken, and ligaments in his leg were torn. Wittek would continue to regularly film his Jeff’s Barbershop series without addressing the injuries.

The docuseries Don’t Try This at Home was released in April 2021 after nearly ten months of speculation from the public, and comprised five episodes in which Wittek explained the circumstances surrounding the injury, described life in recovery from a near-fatal accident, and also spoke about how the incident affected his relationship with Dobrik. After releasing the first episode, Wittek pivoted to Patreon because the footage of his injuries was deemed too graphic for YouTube. His Patreon account gained 37,000 followers in the first 10 days, making him one of the most-followed creators on that platform and the highest-paid creator of 18+ content on the platform.

In March 2022, it was revealed in leaked footage from an upcoming documentary by fellow YouTuber Casey Neistat and in an episode of Dobrik's "Views" podcast that David Dobrik was evidently blaming Jeff Wittek for the accident. Dobrik allegedly stated that the accident involving the excavator was the idea of Wittek and that he should be taking more responsibility, which Wittek quickly denied in a response video on the "JEFF FM" YouTube channel. Within his response, Wittek asserted he refused to appear on an episode of Dobrik's "Views" podcast, claiming that Dobrik would attempt to manipulate his words and editing into blaming Wittek for his physical and emotional trauma, along with a sense of discomfort around the individual that caused such suffering.

In June 2022, it was revealed that Dobrik was being sued for $10 million by Jeff Wittek in relation to the 2020 accident. The lawsuit does not detail specifics for the myriad of injuries Wittek experienced, although in his 2021 docuseries, it was heavily mentioned that he faced the possibility of losing his eye, which is included in the suit. This is after claiming in February 2022 that he "almost died" the day of the accident. In response, Dobrik claims Wittek knew how risky the stunt was and can't blame him for his injuries, asking the judge to dismiss the complaint and award nothing to Jeff.

Awards and nominations

Streamy Awards 
The YouTube Streamy Awards are an award show presented by Tubefilter which recognizes and honors excellence in online video, including directing, acting, producing, and writing. The formal ceremony at which the awards are presented takes place in Los Angeles, California.

References

External links 
 
 

21st-century American comedians
21st-century American male actors
American podcasters
American YouTubers
Comedy YouTubers
Living people
Patreon creators
People from Staten Island
YouTube controversies
YouTube vloggers
1989 births